Todd Rosenthal is an American scenic designer. He won the 2008 Tony Award for Best Scenic Design and the 2009 Laurence Olivier Award for Best Set Design for Steppenwolf Theatre Company's August: Osage County.

A native of Longmeadow, Massachusetts, Rosenthal received a Bachelor of Arts degree from Colgate University and a Master of Fine Arts from the Yale School of Drama, where he received the Donald M. Oenslager Scholarship for Stage Design. He also studied at the Art Students League of New York and Moore College of Art.

Rosenthal made his Broadway debut with August: Osage County. He considered the three-level set, which he called a juxtaposition of the "gothic and the whimsical," to be a central character in the play. Of it he said, "It's immovable, an indelible image ... people move out, but the house never changes."

Rosenthal's regional theatre credits include productions for the Goodman Theatre, Steppenwolf Theatre Company, Centerstage in Baltimore, Alley Theatre in Houston, the Philadelphia Theatre Company, San Jose Repertory Theatre, Alliance Theatre in Atlanta, Yale Repertory Theatre, Lyric Opera of Chicago, Arena Stage in Washington, D.C., the Paper Mill Playhouse in Millburn, New Jersey, Notre Dame Shakespeare Festival, and the Big Apple Circus.

Rosenthal's commercial projects include micro-brewery-themed restaurants for Anheuser Busch; a pirate-themed restaurant at the Treasure Island Hotel and Casino on the Las Vegas Strip; and a mining-themed tavern and restaurant for the Copper Mountain Resort in Colorado.

Rosenthal was an adjunct professor of design at DePaul University from 1995 until 2003. He has been a professor in the Department of Theatre at Northwestern University since Autumn 2003.

References

External links
Official website

Year of birth missing (living people)
Living people
People from Longmeadow, Massachusetts
American scenic designers
Tony Award winners
Laurence Olivier Award winners
Colgate University alumni
Yale School of Drama alumni
DePaul University faculty
Northwestern University faculty
Moore College of Art and Design alumni